This is a list of prefects of Split-Dalmatia County.

Prefects of Split-Dalmatia County (1993–present)

See also
Split-Dalmatia County

Notes

External links
World Statesmen - Split-Dalmatia County

prefects of Split-Dalmatia County